Lushin Dubey is an Indian stage actor and director. She directed, acted and scripted many drama productions for over 20 years. Lushin is also known for her solo plays Untitled and Pinki Virani's Bitter Chocolate with theatre director Arvind Gaur. She acted in films like Partition (2007), Murder Unveiled (2005) — for which she won 2006 Gemini Award for Best Performance by an Actress in a Featured Supporting Role in a Dramatic Program or Mini-Series — and Perfect Husband.

Personal life 
Lushin was born as Lushin Keswani to a Sindhi Hindu family. Her father, Govind Keswani, was an engineer with the Indian Railways, and her mother, Leela, was a gynaecologist who worked with the Indian Army. Her father named her after the Russian aircraft Ilyushin.

Lushin did her M.Sc. in Childhood and Special Education in the US, after a Masters in History from the Lady Shri Ram College for Women (LSR), University of Delhi, India.

Lushin is married with two daughters, Ilina and Tara. Her sister Lillete and niece Ira (Lillete's daughter) are also actresses. She also has a brother named Patanjali. Her husband Pradeep Dubey is a Leading Professor of Economics at Stony Brook University and Adjunct Professor at Yale. In her college days she acted with Barry John.

Theatre 
Lushin's first solo play Untitled solo directed and scripted by Arvind Gaur, traveled to the US, UK and the Edinburgh Fringe Festival. Untitled has completed more than 200 shows. Some of the cities have been Boston, Chicago, Rochester, New York, Dallas, Houston, Washington, D.C., and Palo Alto. It has been staged at the Smithsonian Institution and at Harvard.

Her second solo Bitter Chocolate is based on Pinki Virani's book and scripted-directed by Arvind Gaur.

Lushin Dubey's third solo I Will Not Cry is scripted and directed by Arvind Gaur. This play is an exceptional blend of theatre and multimedia, highlighting the issue of child survival through satire, reality and music excerpts. It brings alive the sad truth of millions of unnecessary deaths of children in India. The performance by Lushin Dubey evokes collective responsibility among the audience to be a part of social change. The play performed in Delhi, Mumbai, Kolkata, Jaipur and Lucknow in collaboration of Save The Children. In Jaipur it was staged at Jawahar Kala Kendra where well-known theatre personalities Hemant Acharaya and Sandeep Madan provided vital support.

Her fourth solo play with Theatre director Arvind Gaur is 'Aruna's Story' based on Pinki Virani's book on Aruna Shanbaug case. Gaur scripted it as solo play.

Her major directed plays are Life of Gautam Budda, Mushkan.
She acted with Alyque Padamsee in William Shakespeare's Macbeth.
In 2009 she directed Salam India, a play inspired by diplomat writer Pavan K. Varma's very well-received book, Being Indian.

Filmography

TV serials 
 Rajdhani
 Made in Heaven (2019) - Sheila Naqvi (Faiza Naqvi's mother)

Awards 
 Karmaveer Puraskaar Noble Laureates, 2009
 Radha Krishna Award for her contribution to Delhi’s art & culture,2009

References

External links
 
 Lushin ubey website

Actresses from Delhi
Indian stage actresses
Indian film actresses
Indian theatre directors
Living people
Lady Shri Ram College alumni
Best Supporting Actress in a Television Film or Miniseries Canadian Screen Award winners
Year of birth missing (living people)
Place of birth missing (living people)
Indian television actresses
Actresses in Hindi cinema
21st-century Indian actresses